Rosa Nissán Rovero (known as Rosa Nissán; born June 15, 1939) is a Mexican writer of Sephardic origin. She is the author of the novel Novia que te vea (1992), which was made into a movie. She received the Ariel León Dultzin Award, from the Association of Israeli Journalists and Writers in Mexico, in 1994.

Biography
Rosa Nissán Rovero was born in Mexico City on June 15, 1939. She studied journalism at the Women's University of Mexico.

In 1992, she published her first novel Novia que te vea. The novel addresses the issue of cultural integration of Jewish communities in Mexico and questions the traditional role of Jewish women, as well as the customs and traditions of the Sephardic community.

Two years later, her second novel was published, Hisho que te nazca, a continuation of Novia que te vea, and that same year, some short stories were also published in No sólo para dormir es la noche (Not only to sleep is the night), where she brings together a collection of stories in which the problems of partner and loneliness are determining factors. 

From 2000 to 2002, she gave various workshops on fictionalized autobiography in the Casa del Lago Juan José Arreola, at the University of the Cloister of Sor Juana. and the Casa del Refugio.

Selected works 
 Novia que te vea, 1992, Planeta.
 Hisho que te nazca, 2006, Planeta.
 Las tierras prometidas, 1997, Plaza & Janés.
 No solo para dormir es la noche, 1999, Patria.
 Los viajes de mi cuerpo, 1999, Planeta.
 Me viene un modo de tristeza

References

1939 births
Living people
Writers from Mexico City
20th-century Mexican novelists
20th-century Mexican women writers
Mexican women novelists